Romanovce is a village in the municipality of Kumanovo, North Macedonia.

Demographics
On the 1927 ethnic map of Leonhard Schulze-Jena, the village is written as "Ramanovci" and shown as a Turkish village. According to the 2002 census, the village had a total of 2794 inhabitants. Ethnic groups in the village include:

Albanians 2028
Macedonians 716
Macedonian Muslims 35
Macedonian Serbs 6 
Macedonian Others 9

References

External links

Villages in Kumanovo Municipality
Albanian communities in North Macedonia